ShowBiz Pizza Place, often shortened to ShowBiz Pizza or ShowBiz, was an American family entertainment center and restaurant pizza chain founded in 1980 by Robert L. Brock and Creative Engineering, created and founded by Aaron Fechter. It emerged after a separation between Brock and owners of the Chuck E. Cheese franchise, Pizza Time Theatre. ShowBiz Pizza restaurants entertained guests through a large selection of arcade games, coin-operated rides and animatronic stage shows.

The two companies became competitors and found early success, partly due to the rise in popularity of arcade games during the late 1970s and early 1980s. The type of animatronics used in the ShowBiz Pizza chain distinguished it from its rivals, which offered many of the same services. Following Pizza Time Theatre's bankruptcy in 1984, ShowBiz merged with the struggling franchise to settle a former court settlement mandate, forming ShowBiz Pizza Time. By 1992, all ShowBiz Pizza locations were rebranded as Chuck E. Cheese locations.

History

Atari co-founder Nolan Bushnell, responsible for creating the first widely recognized video game, Pong, headed a project in the mid-1970s for Atari to launch the first arcade-oriented, family restaurant with computer-programmed animatronics. At a time when arcades were popular in bowling alleys and bars, Bushnell sought to expose younger audiences to arcade games. In 1977, Atari opened the first Chuck E. Cheese's Pizza Time Theatre in San Jose, CA. The concept was an immediate success, and after leaving Atari in 1978, Bushnell purchased the Pizza Time restaurant, forming a new company, Pizza Time Theatre Inc.

As Bushnell marketed the franchise, hoping to expand into new markets, the concept attracted high-profile clients such as Robert L. Brock, known for his extensive portfolio of Holiday Inn hotels. In 1979, Brock signed a multi-million-dollar franchising agreement with Pizza Time Theatre Inc., planning to open as many as 280 Chuck E. Cheese's locations across 16 states. Shortly thereafter, Brock noticed that companies such as Creative Engineering, Inc. (CEI) were designing more advanced animatronics, and was concerned that competitors would emerge with better technology. Bushnell had reassured Brock at the signing of the franchising agreement that the company's technology would continue to evolve. However, prior to the opening of his first location, Brock decided to void the agreement with Pizza Time and form a partnership with CEI.

The first ShowBiz Pizza Place opened in Kansas City, Missouri, on March 3, 1980. The Brock Hotel Corporation owned 80% of ShowBiz Pizza Place, while the other 20% was owned by CEI, which produced the chain's animatronics show, The Rock-afire Explosion. By September 1981, there were 48 company-owned outlets and 42 franchises. The company moved its headquarters to Irving, Texas in 1982.

ShowBiz Pizza Time, Inc.
In 1984, Chuck E. Cheese's Pizza Time Theatre filed for Chapter 11 bankruptcy, and its assets were purchased by ShowBiz parent company Brock Hotel Corp. The two operations merged, and the newly formed company was named ShowBiz Pizza Time, Inc. – a combination of the names of the previous two companies. However, both restaurant chains continued operating as separate entities.

Richard M. Frank joined the company as president and chief operating officer in 1985. In 1986, he was named chairman and chief executive officer of the restaurant division. Based on customer research, Frank instituted a number of changes to appeal to younger children and parents. Specific measures included increased lighting, a redesigned food menu, table service, self-serve fountain drinks, a revamped ride selection, and distinct toddler areas, but relations between ShowBiz and Creative Engineering began to deteriorate. Aaron Fechter, founder of CEI and creator of The Rock-afire Explosion, would later claim in 2008 that the fallout was due to a demand by Showbiz to own CEI's licensing and copyrights to the animatronics show. Fechter says he refused, since Showbiz did not offer monetary compensation for the rights. Despite the refusal, CEI's creative control was jeopardized, as ShowBiz had the ability to program the characters and replicate their voices, allowing them to make changes to the skits. ShowBiz later returned the recording rights to Fechter following CEI's Liberty Show production (in commemoration of the Statue of Liberty's centennial in 1986), but they did not return the programming rights.

In 1989, ShowBiz Pizza Time became a public company with its stock market launch. The following year, it severed all ties with CEI and began restructuring the restaurant chains under "Concept Unification". The change consisted of removing the Rock-afire Explosion animatronic show from their restaurants, and converting it into a new show called "Chuck E. Cheese & Munch's Make Believe Band", featuring the Chuck E. Cheese's Pizza Time Theatre characters. In addition, all ShowBiz Pizza locations in the U.S. were rebranded as Chuck E. Cheese's, effectively ending the "ShowBiz Pizza" brand. By 1992, the conversion was complete, and ShowBiz Pizza Time became known as CEC Entertainment, Inc. In 1998 the company moved its stock from NASDAQ to NYSE. In February 2014, the company was purchased by Apollo Global Management for $1.3 billion.

Logos

See also

List of pizza chains of the United States

References

Pizza chains of the United States
Pizza franchises
Defunct pizzerias
Video arcades
Restaurants established in 1980
Restaurants disestablished in 1992
Defunct companies based in Kansas
Defunct restaurant chains in the United States
Theme restaurants
Animatronic attractions
1980 establishments in Kansas
1992 disestablishments in Texas
American companies established in 1980
American companies disestablished in 1992